Richard Morris may refer to:
 Richard Morris (actor) (1862–1924), Silent era American actor 
 Richard Morris (archaeologist) (born 1947), English archaeologist and historian
 Richard Morris (author) (1939–2003), American author, editor, and poet
 Richard Morris (editor) (1703–1779), Welsh folklorist and editor of the Welsh-language Bible
 Richard Morris (philologist) (1833–1894), English philologist, Anglican priest, and writer
 Richard Morris (songwriter), American songwriter and record producer
 Richard B. Morris (1904–1989), American historian
 Richard Morris (industrialist) (1925–2008), British engineer and industrialist
 Richard G. Morris (born 1948), British neuroscientist and memory researcher
 Richard Magnus Franz Morris (1934–2012), Liberian business and civic leader
 Richard Thacker Morris (1917–1981), American sociologist and author
 Dick Morris (born 1947), American political author and commentator

Politics and law 

 Richard Morris (New York judge) (1730–1810), New York politician and Chief Justice of the Supreme Court
 Richard Valentine Morris (1765–1814), U.S. Navy officer and New York politician
 Richard Morris (Texas judge) (1815–1844), Republic of Texas Supreme Court Justice, 1841–1844
 Richard P. Morris (1855–1925), mayor of Salt Lake City, Utah
 Richard Morris (British politician) (1869–1956), British Member of Parliament for Battersea North, 1918–1922
 Richard Morris (diplomat) (1967–2020), British diplomat
 Rick Morris (politician) (born 1968), U.S. politician in Virginia

Sports 

 Richard Morris (athlete) (1921–1995), British Olympic athlete
 Rick Morris (ice hockey) (1946–1998), Canadian ice hockey player
 Richard Morris (South African cricketer) (born 1947), South African cricketer, played  Western Province 1967–79
 Richard Morris (English cricketer) (born 1987), English cricketer, played for Loughborough University
Dickie Morris (1879–?), Welsh footballer who played as an inside forward

See also 
 Richard Maurice (1893–1955), filmmaker